Richard Jackson (born 4 July 1900) was an English professional footballer. He played for Rotherham County, its successor Rotherham United, and Gillingham between 1922 and 1934.

References

1900 births
Year of death missing
English footballers
Gillingham F.C. players
Rotherham County F.C. players
Rotherham United F.C. players
People from Spennymoor
Footballers from County Durham
Association footballers not categorized by position